Mary Jo Wilhelm (born 1955) is a former Iowa State Senator who represented the 26th District. A Democrat, she served in the Iowa Senate from 2009 to 2017. She has been a Certified Residential Appraiser since 2000, and is the founder and owner of Wilhelm Appraisers.

Wilhelm currently serves on several committees in the Iowa Senate - the Economic Growth committee; the Education committee; the Environment & Energy Independence committee; the Human Resources committee; and the Ways and Means committee. She also serves on the Agriculture and Natural Resources Appropriations Subcommittee. Her prior political experience includes serving on the Howard County Board of Supervisors.

Wilhelm was elected in 2008 with 14,862 votes, defeating Republican incumbent Mark Zieman.

References

External links
Senator Mary Jo Wilhelm official Iowa Legislature site
Senator Mary Jo Wilhelm official Iowa General Assembly site
State Senator Mary Jo Wilhelm official constituency site
 

Living people
Democratic Party Iowa state senators
Women state legislators in Iowa
County supervisors in Iowa
People from Cresco, Iowa
Place of birth missing (living people)
1955 births
21st-century American politicians
21st-century American women politicians